Morton Brown (born August 12, 1931, in New York City, New York) is an American mathematician, who specializes in geometric topology.

In 1958 Brown earned his Ph.D. from the University of Wisconsin-Madison under R. H. Bing. From 1960 to 1962 he was at the Institute for Advanced Study. Afterwards he became a professor at the University of Michigan at Ann Arbor.

With Barry Mazur in 1965 he won the Oswald Veblen prize for their independent and nearly simultaneous proofs of the generalized Schoenflies hypothesis in geometric topology. Brown's short proof was elementary and fully general. Mazur's proof was also elementary, but it used a special assumption which was removed via later work of Morse.

In 2012 he became a fellow of the American Mathematical Society.

References

External links
 

20th-century American mathematicians
21st-century American mathematicians
Fellows of the American Mathematical Society
Institute for Advanced Study visiting scholars
University of Michigan faculty
University of Wisconsin–Madison alumni
1931 births
Living people
Topologists
Mathematicians from New York (state)
Scientists from New York City